Another Sunny Afternoon is the second studio album by the American punk rock band Squirtgun. It was released in 1997 through Lookout! Records. It was their last album to feature Dan Lumley on drums until he rejoined in 2008. It was also their last release on Lookout!.

Track listing
All songs written by Squirtgun.

"Field Trip" - 1:54
"Mary Ann" - 2:36
"Hey Louise" - 2:14
"Another Sunny Afternoon" - 1:53
"Butterbean" - 2:06
"So Cool" - 1:57
"Coffee" - 1:34
"My Jeannette" - 1:50
"Come On, Let's Go" - 1:49
"Normal Girl" - 1:35
"Without a Ticket" - 1:06
"You're the Greatest" - 3:20

Personnel
 Mass Giorgini - bass, vocals, producer
 Flav Giorgini - vocals, guitar
 Matt Leonard - vocals, guitar
 Matt Hart - guitar
 Dan Lumley - drums

1997 albums
Squirtgun albums
Lookout! Records albums